The Mellacorée River  is a short river in Guinea. Most of its lower part is an estuary.

Sources
Oxford Journals Extract

Rivers of Guinea